Cheng Yanqiu (1 January 1904 – 9 March 1958) was a Chinese Peking opera singer. He is remembered as one of the 20th-century's great female impersonators, having specialized in Peking opera's female roles (dan). Yanqiu was a member of the Chinese Communist Party and was buried in Babaoshan Revolutionary Cemetery.

Life
Cheng was born in Beijing.

Cheng was also the creator of several original Peking opera productions in the 1920s and '30s.  During the Second Sino-Japanese War, he refused to perform and instead worked as a farmer in Beijing.  After the war, he was appointed vice president of the Chinese Academy of Traditional Opera.

See also
Mei Lanfang
Shang Xiaoyun
Xun Huisheng

References 

1904 births
1958 deaths
Chinese male Peking opera actors
Singers from Beijing
Male actors from Beijing
20th-century Chinese male actors
20th-century Chinese male singers
Female impersonators in Peking opera
Chinese dramatists and playwrights
Manchu male actors
Manchu singers
Burials at Babaoshan Revolutionary Cemetery